On March 21, 1962, in Brandon, the Wheat Kings captured the Turnbull Memorial Trophy as MJHL champions.

Regular season

All-Star game
The inaugural Manitoba - Saskatchewan all-star game was held in Winnipeg on January 21 before 7,044 fans. The MJHL scored a 6-2
triumph to win the Charlie Gardiner Memorial Trophy. Brandon stars Gerry Kell and Marc Dufour lead the attack with two goals each, Jim Johnson and Paul Allan added singles. Replying for the SJHL were Ron Willy and George Swarbrick.
MJHL Lineup:
Goal: Henry Goy (St. Boniface); Rick Best (Braves)
Defence: John Trojack (St. Boniface); Bob Peers (St. Boniface); Bob Woytowich (Rangers); Dennis Toyne (Rangers); Wayne Schultz (Braves)
Centre: Gerry Kell (Brandon); Bob Stoyko (Rangers); Peter Stemkowski (Monarchs)
Leftwing: Ted Taylor (Brandon); Paul Allan (St. Boniface); Terry Moore (Monarchs)
Rightwing: Marc Dufour (Brandon); Jim Johnson (Rangers); Rick Brown (Brandon)
Coach: Gord Pennell (Rangers); Manager: Jake Milford (Brandon)
Trojack did not play; replaced by Bob Ash (Brandon)

Playoffs
Semi-Finals
Brandon defeated St. Boniface 3-games-to-1
Monarchs defeated Rangers 3-games-to-none
Turnbull Cup Championship
Brandon defeated Monarchs 4-games-to-1
Western Memorial Cup Semi-Final
Brandon defeated Port Arthur North Stars (TBJHL) 4-games-to-none
Western Memorial Cup Final (Abbott Cup)
Brandon lost to Edmonton Oil Kings (CAHL) 4-games-to-3

Awards

All-Star Teams

References
Manitoba Junior Hockey League
Manitoba Hockey Hall of Fame
Hockey Hall of Fame
Winnipeg Free Press Archives
Brandon Sun Archives

MJHL
Manitoba Junior Hockey League seasons